Gangem is a village in the newly formed taluka (sub-district) of Ponda in Goa. Although its under the Ponda taluka and administrative jurisdiction, the assembly constituency is Valpoi from 2011

Area, population

According to the official 2011 Census, Gangem has an area of 544.05 hectares, a total of 112 households, a population of 473 (comprising 251 males and 222 females) with an under-six years population of 50 (comprising 26 boys and 24 girls).

Location

Gangem is located in the north eastern end of ponda taluka.  It is to the north of Usgao-Tisk.

It lies approx 44.7 km away from the district North Goa headquarters of Panaji or Panjim.

Local jurisdiction

Gangem lies under the Usgao Ganjem gram panchayat.

References

Villages in North Goa district